Valentine Ratz (November 12, 1848 – March 1, 1924) was a Canadian lumber merchant and politician in the province of Ontario.

Born in St. Jacobs, County of Waterloo, Canada West, the son of Jacob Ratz, Ratz received his education at Pine Hill Public School. As a lumber merchant, he was President of the South River Lumber Company of Parry Sound District. In 1879 he entered the municipal council of the Township of Stephen and was Deputy Reeve and Reeve. He was also elected Warden of the County of Huron in 1886. In 1873, Ratz married Mary Yagers. He was first elected to the House of Commons of Canada for the electoral district of Middlesex North in the general election of 1896. A Liberal, he was defeated in the 1900 federal election and was re-elected in the 1904 federal election. He was summoned to the Senate of Canada for the senatorial division of Parkhill, Ontario on the advice of Prime Minister Wilfrid Laurier in 1909. He served until his death in Guelph in 1924.

References

1848 births
1924 deaths
Canadian senators from Ontario
Liberal Party of Canada MPs
Liberal Party of Canada senators
Members of the House of Commons of Canada from Ontario
People from Woolwich, Ontario